MATRAI is the sum of abbreviations of RAI (Islamic Republic of Iran Railways ) and MAT (research center) and means Iran Railway Research Center

profile:
The Railway Research Center (MATRAI)is research department of Iranian Railways.  
Besides The main activities of doing railway related research projects and development, it is a key consultative body for railway senior directors. MATRAI has other activities, such as; keeping a close relation with state and aboard universities and research centers; supporting university thesis; establishing technical seminars and conferences over the railway field; offering technical services through its enrich technical documents center.

 
Goals: 
1. Railway research development in passenger and freight traffic
2. Establishing the proper base for upgrading the railway research activities 
3.  Cooperation with educational and research institutes for upgrading the research activities quality and utilizing of internal ability
4. Feasibility studies and technical and economical assessment of developing projects 
5. Study on safety promotion and accident prevention  
6. Study on the application of railway policy and development of network and fleet 
7. Study and research on new technologies transfer

Tasks: 
1. Consider and investigation of railway industry research needs 
2. Perform the research, developing and applied plans in railway industry 
3. Supply the necessary and proper facilities based on research activities 
4. Publishing the railway books and the other publications
5.Holding the national and international scientific and specialty conferences based on railway
6. Utilizing of the recent scientific information about railway by regular connection with the world universities and research centers

Groups: 
The groups and units of the center are as follows: 
1.	operating group 
2.	way and works group
3.	manufacturing and production group
4.	signaling and telecommunication group 
5.	locomotive and car group 
6.	machinery group
7.	economic studies group
8.	information technology group
9.	laboratory division
10.	productivity unit 
11.	project control unit 
12.	industry and university connection unit 
13.	contract affairs unit 
14.	supply unit
15.	financial affairs department 
16.	administrative affairs department

Some of the important research projects: 
1.	Construction of automatic train control system ATC, PATC 
2.	Construction of hybrid locomotive 
3.	Operating locomotive GT26 simulator system 
4.	Design and construction of rail bus and two purposes rail truck 
5.	Design and construction of the intelligent barrier system of railway level crossings 
6.	Construction of 14 inch brake cylinder of freight cars 
7.	Study on the decreasing of passenger train traveling time (Tehran- Miane- Tehran)   
8.	Design and construction of wheel and rail wear test system
9.	considering the track electrification criteria in Iran

Titles of some glories and measures: 
1.	Taking the certificate of ISO 9001; 2000 in 2003. 
2.	Selecting this center as a sample research center in ministry roads and transportation for two times 
3.	selecting at least, 4 superior researchers from the center staffs in the ministry roads and transportation and in Iran 
4.	holding 7 seminars on rail transportation 
5.	holding 6 seminars on safety promotion and accident prevention 
6.	presenting papers in international conferences 
7.	presenting papers in national conferences, UIC conferences, international level crossing conference in Canada, IHHA conference, World Congress on Railway Research (WCRR) conference, international symposium of Turkish railway, international safety railway conference
8.	connection with international association such as UIC

locomotive productivity

There was an important trend of productivity in railway from the end of 1990 after the first phase of locomotive productivity campaign that increased the heavy locomotives output about 50%. in second phase another 33% in locomotive loading capability was add after the tests of MATRAI in 1997.

Hybrid locomotive

The First Evaluating prototype Hybrid locomotive was designed and contracted by railway research center MATRAI in 1998 and the sample was ready in 2001. It was a G12 locomotive that was converted to hybrid by using a 200KW diesel generator and batteries and also was equipped with 2 AC traction motors (out of 4) retrofit in the cover of the DC traction motors.  It was inaugurated by missed Dr, Rahman Dadman the minister of road and transportation in 2001.

AC Diesel locomotive

The initial diesel locomotive fleet in Iran that was introduced in 1956 was G12 with DC-DC traction system that was replaced with 1971 by GT26CW from Electro-Motive Diesel with 21% AWA (All weather adhesion).

In 1992 the GE locomotive was introduced that had AC/DC traction system with 26% AWA and in 2002 the first AC-AC diesel locomotive AD43C was received from Alstom, the specification of this 4300 hp locomotive was prepared in MATRAI that the tractive effort of them was 2 times of GT26.

Wheel View

The trend to increase the weight and length of trains is considerably fast and specially by increasing the cost of energy.
Accordingly, it would be more difficult to observe the defects of the cars individually, this was the reason to start developing the first image processing system to check the wheel profile in motion.
The first contract was signed in 1998 and the Evaluating Prototype was installed in Rey station near Tehran in 2000.

Tractomobile

Turbotrain repowering

PATC

GPS

Air conditioning unit

air conditioning was a project for local manufacturing from 1998 to 2000 .

Electronic interlocking system

Matrai Managers

Behyar Senobari

Abbas Ghorbanalibeik

Jahangirian

See also

 Islamic Republic of Iran Railways
 Railway electrification in Iran

Rail transport in Iran